Thewarathantrige Lalithamana Fernando (born 27 December 1962) is a former Sri Lankan cricketer who played in one One Day International in 1989.

1962 births
Living people
Sri Lanka One Day International cricketers
Sri Lankan cricketers
Colts Cricket Club cricketers
Burgher Recreation Club cricketers
Kandurata cricketers